Marco Berardi (born 12 February 1993) is a former Sanmarinese football player who played as a defender.

Career

Berardi debuted with the senior national team on 5 September 2015 in a UEFA Euro 2016 qualifying match against England.

External links

1993 births
Living people
Sammarinese footballers
Association football defenders
S.S. Folgore Falciano Calcio players
San Marino international footballers